Sheikha Wafa Hasher Al Maktoum (Arabic: الشيخة وفاء حشر آل مكتوم) is an Emirati artist and curator, member of Dubai's ruling family and founder of FN Design; a multi-functional space for art & design events in Al Quoz, UAE. She is also the Founder and Director of FN Designs, a multi-disciplined art gallery and design studio in Al Serkal Avenue, Dubai. She is a first cousin of Hamdan bin Mohammed Al Maktoum, Crown Prince of Dubai.

Exhibitions 
 2015 FISTICUFFS, Alserkal Avenue, Dubai, United Arab Emirates (Curator)
 2015 BEAUTOPSY, Alserkal Avenue, Dubai, United Arab Emirates (Curator)
 2014 SIKKA Art Fair, Al Fahidi m Dubai, United Arab Emirates (Co-curator).
 2014 FAKiE#3, Dubai, United Arab Emirates (artist & curator)
 2009 Sketch, Alserkal Avenue, Dubai, United Arab Emirates (Founder).

Patronage

See also 

SIKKA Art Fair

References 

List of Emirati artists
Emirati women artists
Wafa